The floods in South Africa in February 2023 were caused by heavy rainfall as a result of the La Niña weather phenomenon, affecting seven provinces, including Eastern Cape, Northern Cape, Mpumalanga, KwaZulu-Natal, and North West. The floods have caused casualties and damage to homes, businesses, basic infrastructure, roads, bridges and affected crops and livestock.

At least twelve people have died across the provinces and others are missing. In addition to that, two more fatalities have been reported in King Sabata Dalindyebo Local Municipality (Eastern Cape Province), and one person in Komani Town (formerly Queenstown). Several people have been evacuated in Lekwa Local Municipality and residents in the area of Vaal, Vanderkloof, and Bloemhof dams along the Orange River (Northern Cape Province) were invited to evacuate after controlled water discharge operate by local authorities. In Mpumalanga province, about 300 families have been evacuated.

The South African Weather Service predicted "persistent and heavy" rains ahead, with the risk of further flooding due to "waterlogged soils and saturated rivers".

In response to the floods, President Cyril Ramaphosa declared on February 13 the State of National Disaster in seven provinces.

See also 

 2022 KwaZulu-Natal floods - deadly floods in 2022

References 

2023 floods in Africa
2023 in South Africa
Floods in South Africa
2023 disasters in South Africa